The Wild Dog Dingo is a 1962 Soviet drama film directed by Yuli Karasik. It is based on the novel Wild Dog Dingo or the Tale of the First Love by Ruvim Frayerman.

Plot 
The film tells about a girl named Tanya, who lives with her mother and falls in love with adopted son of her father, who visits their city with his new wife.

Cast 
 Galina Polskikh as Tanya
 Vladimir Osobik as Kolya
 Talas Umurzakov as Filka
 Anna Rodionova as Zhenya
 Inna Kondrateva as mother
 Nikolai Timofeyev as father
 Irina Radchenko as second wife
 Tamara Loginova as Aleksandra Ivanovna  
 Antonina Pavlycheva as Tanya's grandmother
 Vadim Kurkov as amateur performance leader

References

External links 
 

1962 films
1960s Russian-language films
Soviet drama films
1962 drama films
Films based on Russian novels
Lenfilm films
Soviet black-and-white films
Soviet teen drama films